Street of Dreams is a song by the English hard rock band Rainbow. The song was the first single from the band's album Bent Out of Shape, on which the band tried to repeat their previous success with their album Straight Between the Eyes and the single "Stone Cold".

Ritchie Blackmore has stated that "Street of Dreams" is one of his favourite Rainbow songs.

Music video
A music video was also made for the song, directed by Storm Thorgerson. The video opens with a woman being gagged, strapped to a chair and being locked in a closet by a psychiatrist. The psychiatrist closes the closet door, before he takes in the woman's boyfriend, named Mark, as a patient. Mark tells the psychiatrist about a dream he has been having. In the dream, there is a street full of beds, and a rock n' roll band plays a song in a basement, while Mark is by a lake, seeing his girlfriend being kidnapped — and his girlfriend has disappeared in real life. The evil psychiatrist suggests that he hypnotise Mark, who in turn agrees and soon falls asleep. The song starts playing, while we see everything that Mark described. Soon, Mark starts waking up upon hearing the sound of his girlfriend kicking the closet door. Mark pushes the psychiatrist aside and frees his girlfriend. As the two flee, the psychiatrist tries to stop them, but Mark knocks him out, and in the last scene, we see the psychiatrist falling into the same lake as in Mark's dream.

According to Blackmore's biography on his official website, the music video for "Street of Dreams" was banned by MTV for its supposedly controversial hypnotic video clip. This was not the case as the video received countless airplay when released with Dr. Thomas Radecki of the National Coalition on Television Violence criticizing MTV for airing the video, which completely contradicted Blackmore's claim.

Personnel
Ritchie Blackmore - guitar
David Rosenthal - keyboard
Roger Glover - bass, percussion
Chuck Burgi - drums
Joe Lynn Turner - vocals

Chart performance

References

1983 songs
Songs written by Ritchie Blackmore
Rainbow (rock band) songs